Americana (1971) is American novelist Don DeLillo's first book. DeLillo conceived the novel while traveling through Maine with friends. In 1989, DeLillo revised the text, excising several pages from the original.

Content
The book is narrated by David Bell, a former television executive turned avant-garde filmmaker. Beginning with an exploration of the malaise of the modern corporate man, the novel turns into an interrogation of film's power to misrepresent reality as Bell creates an autobiographical road-movie. The story addresses roots of American pathology and introduces themes DeLillo expanded upon in The Names (1982), White Noise (1985), and Libra (1988). The first half of the novel can be viewed as a critique of the corporate world while the second half articulates the fears and dilemmas of contemporary American life.

References

1971 American novels
Novels by Don DeLillo
Houghton Mifflin books
1971 debut novels